Frank Harris (14 February 1855 – 26 August 1931) was an Irish-American editor, novelist, short story writer, journalist and publisher, who was friendly with many well-known figures of his day.

Born in Ireland, he emigrated to the United States early in life, working in a variety of unskilled jobs before attending the University of Kansas to study law. After graduation, he quickly tired of his legal career and returned to Europe in 1882. He traveled in continental Europe before settling in London to pursue a career in journalism. In 1921, in his sixties, he became a US citizen. Though he attracted much attention during his life for his irascible, aggressive personality, editorship of famous periodicals, and friendship with the talented and famous, he is remembered mainly for his multiple-volume memoir My Life and Loves, which was banned in countries around the world for its sexual explicitness.

Biography

Early years
Harris was born James Thomas Harris in 1855, in Galway, Ireland, to Welsh parents. His father, Thomas Vernon Harris, was a naval officer from Fishguard, Pembrokeshire, Wales. While living with his older brother he was, for a year or more, a pupil at The Royal School, Armagh. At the age of 12 he was sent to Wales to continue his education as a boarder at the Ruabon Grammar School in Denbighshire, a time he was to remember later in My Life and Loves.  Harris was unhappy at the school and ran away within a year.

Harris ran away to the United States in late 1869, arriving in New York City virtually penniless. The 14-year-old took a series of odd jobs to support himself, working first as a boot black, a porter, a general laborer, and a construction worker on the erection of the Brooklyn Bridge. Harris would later turn these early occupational experiences into art, incorporating tales from them into his book The Bomb.

From New York Harris moved to the American Midwest, settling in the country's second largest city, Chicago, where he took a job as a hotel clerk and eventually a manager. Owing to Chicago's central place in the meat packing industry, Harris made the acquaintance of various cattlemen, who inspired him to leave the big city to take up work as a cowboy. Harris eventually grew tired of life in the cattle industry and enrolled at the University of Kansas, where he studied law and earned a degree, gaining admission to the Kansas state bar association.

In 1878, in Brighton, he married Florence Ruth Adams, who died the following year.

Return to Europe

Harris was not cut out to be a lawyer and soon decided to turn his attention to literature. He moved to England in 1882, later traveling to various cities in Germany, Austria, France, and Greece on his literary quest. He worked briefly as an American newspaper correspondent before settling down in England to seriously pursue the vocation of journalism.

Harris first came to general notice as the editor of a series of London papers including the Evening News, the Fortnightly Review and the Saturday Review, the last-named being the high point of his journalistic career, with H. G. Wells and George Bernard Shaw as regular contributors.

From 1908 to 1914 Harris concentrated on working as a novelist, authoring a series of popular books such as The Bomb, The Man Shakespeare, and The Yellow Ticket and Other Stories. With the advent of World War I in the summer of 1914, Harris decided to return to the United States.

From 1916 to 1922 he edited the U.S. edition of Pearson's Magazine, a popular monthly which combined short story fiction with socialist-tinted features on contemporary news topics. One issue of the publication was banned from the mails by Postmaster General Albert S. Burleson during the period of American participation in the Great War. Despite this Harris managed to navigate the delicate situation which faced the left wing press and to keep the Pearson's functioning and solvent during the war years.

Harris became an American citizen in April 1921. In 1922 he travelled to Berlin to publish his best-known work, his autobiography My Life and Loves (published in four volumes, 1922–1927). It is notorious for its graphic descriptions of Harris' purported sexual encounters and for its exaggeration of the scope of his adventures and his role in history. Years later, Time magazine reflected in its 21 March 1960 issue "Had he not been a thundering liar, Frank Harris would have been a great autobiographer ... he had the crippling disqualification that he told the truth, as Max Beerbohm remarked, only 'when his invention flagged'." A fifth volume, supposedly taken from his notes but of doubtful provenance, was published in 1954, long after his death.

Harris also wrote short stories and novels, two books on Shakespeare, a series of biographical sketches in five volumes under the title Contemporary Portraits and biographies of his friends Oscar Wilde and George Bernard Shaw. His attempts at playwriting were less successful: only Mr. and Mrs. Daventry (1900) (which was based on an idea by Oscar Wilde) was produced on the stage.

Death and legacy
Married three times, Harris died in Nice aged 75 on 26 August 1931, of a heart attack. He was subsequently buried at Cimetière Sainte-Marguerite, adjacent to the Cimetière Caucade, in the same city.

Just after his death a biography written by Hugh Kingsmill (pseudonym of Hugh Kingsmill Lunn) was published.

Works
Elder Conklin: And Other Stories (1894)
Montes the Matador & Other Stories (London, Grant Richards, 1900)
The Bomb (1908)
The Man Shakespeare and his Tragic Life Story (London, Frank Palmer, 1909)
Unpath'd Waters (1915). Stories.
The Yellow Ticket And Other Stories (Grant Richards Ltd., 1914)
The Spectacle Maker (1913) basis for 1934 movie
The Veils of Isis, and Other Stories (1915)
 England or Germany ? ( 1915 )
Contemporary Portraits... in four vols (1915–1923)
Oscar Wilde, His Life and Confessions (1916)
My Life and Loves, (1922–1927, 1931, 1954, 1963 (complete))
Undream'd of Shores (London, Grant Richards, 1924). Stories.
The Tom Cat: An Apologue (1928). Short story.
My Reminiscences as a Cowboy (1930)
Confessional (1930). Essays.
Pantopia: A Novel (1930)
Bernard Shaw (1931)
The Short Stories of Frank Harris, a Selection (1975). Elmer Gertz, ed.

Cultural references

In 1920, French writer and diplomat Paul Morand met an aged Frank Harris in Nice and borrowed much of his personality to create the character of O'Patah, a larger than life writer, publisher and Irish patriot, "the last of the Irish bards" in his short story La nuit de Portofino kulm (part of the famed collection of short stories Fermé la nuit) published in 1923 by Gallimard.

In 1922, Whittaker Chambers published a "blasphemous" and "sacrilegious" playlet called "A Play for Puppets" in The Morningside, a Columbia University student magazine, based on Frank Harris' 1919 play Miracle of the Stigmata, for which Chambers quit school to avoid expulsion. ("The greater part of it is so plainly sacrilegious that it cannot be reproduced.")

In 1929, Cole Porter's song "After All, I'm Only a Schoolgirl" references Harris and "My Life and Loves", in a tale about a girl who is learning about adult relationships from a private tutor.

In 1936, Harris appeared as a character in the play Oscar Wilde, by Leslie & Sewell Stokes, first produced at London's Gate Theatre Studio (1936) and later at the Fulton Theatre, New York, in 1938, in both cases starring Robert Morley in the title role.

In 1958, the feature film Cowboy is an adaptation of the semi-autobiographical novel My Reminiscences as a Cowboy. Harris is played by Jack Lemmon.

In 1960, he is seen as a minor character in The Trials of Oscar Wilde played by Paul Rogers. Harris had specifically warned Wilde against prosecuting Queensberry for criminal libel, which led to his downfall.

In a 1972 episode of The Edwardians, he was played by John Bennett.

A volume by Frank Harris held up the couch in "Six Big Boobies" (1985) episode of 'Allo 'Allo.

On television, Harris was played by Leonard Rossiter in a 1978 BBC Play of the Week: Fearless Frank, or, Tidbits From The Life Of An Adventurer.

In 1980, a musical stage adaptation of Fearless Frank briefly ran on Broadway at the Princess Theatre, with Niall Toibin in the starring role. It had book and lyrics by Andrew Davies, music by Dave Brown, and was directed by Robert Gillespie. The production ran for 13 previews and 12 performances.

He is a character in the 1997 Tom Stoppard play The Invention of Love, which deals with the life of A. E. Housman and the Oscar Wilde trials.

He appears as a close friend of Oscar Wilde in the award-winning play by Moisés Kaufman: Gross Indecency: The Three Trials of Oscar Wilde.

He appears in the first episode of the 2001 miniseries The Infinite Worlds of H. G. Wells, rejecting a story from Wells for being too long and too preposterous.

Harris appears as a vampire in Kim Newman's 1992 novel Anno Dracula, as the mentor and vampire sire of one of the novel's main characters.

In the ITV series Mr Selfridge (2013), Samuel West plays a newspaper editor and publisher called Frank Edwards, a character based on Frank Harris.

Sherlock Holmes and Dr. Watson meet Harris in Nicholas Meyer's 1976 novel The West End Horror.  Watson comments on Harris' habit of always speaking very loudly.

In the crime comedy Pulp, Michael Caine plays a novelist who someone compares to Frank Harris, in which Caine glibly replies, "Frank was a novice."

References

Further reading

 Philippa Pullar, Frank Harris. 1975.
 Robert Brainard Pearsall, Frank Harris. New York: Twayne Publishers, 1970.
 Stanley Weintraub (ed.), The Playwright and the Pirate, Bernard Shaw and Frank Harris: A Correspondence. Pennsylvania State University Press, 1982.
 Charles Chaplin, My Autobiography pages 242–244. Simon and Schuster, 1964
 Kate Stephens, Lies and Libels of Frank Harris, New York, Antigone Press, 1929.

External links

 
 
 
 Extensive website by Alfred Armstrong
 Extended bibliography at ibiblio.com
 Esar Levine's Harris collection at Princeton
 Biographical sketch, Crowley diary quotes
 
 Frank Harris Collection at the Harry Ransom Center at the University of Texas at Austin
Frank Harris Collection at the Kenneth Spencer Research Library at the University of Kansas
 

British erotica writers
British male journalists
1856 births
1931 deaths
People from Galway (city)
People from County Galway
British publishers (people)
People educated at Ruabon Grammar School
University of Kansas alumni
American editors
Irish emigrants to the United States (before 1923)
Irish people of Welsh descent
People with acquired American citizenship